Duke of Bedford (named after Bedford, England) is a title that has been created six times (for five distinct people) in the Peerage of England. The first and second creations came in 1414 and 1433 respectively, both in favour of Henry IV's third son, John, who later served as regent of France. He was made Earl of Kendal at the same time and was made Earl of Richmond later the same year. The titles became extinct on his death in 1435. The third creation came in 1470 in favour of George Neville, nephew of Warwick the Kingmaker. He was deprived of the title by Act of Parliament in 1478. The fourth creation came in 1478 in favour of George, the third son of Edward IV. He died the following year at the age of two. The fifth creation came in 1485 in favour of Jasper Tudor, half-brother of Henry VI and uncle of Henry VII. He had already been created Earl of Pembroke in 1452. However, as he was a Lancastrian, his title was forfeited between 1461 and 1485 during the predominance of the House of York. He regained the earldom in 1485 when his nephew Henry VII came to the throne and was elevated to the dukedom the same year. He had no legitimate children and the titles became extinct on his death in 1495.

The Russell family currently holds the titles of Earl and Duke of Bedford.  John Russell, a close adviser of Henry VIII and Edward VI, was granted the title of Earl of Bedford in 1551, and his descendant William, 5th Earl, was created Duke in 1694, following the Glorious Revolution.

The subsidiary titles of the Duke of Bedford, all in the Peerage of England, are Marquess of Tavistock (created 1694), Earl of Bedford (1550), Baron Russell, of Cheneys (1539), Baron Russell of Thornhaugh in the County of Northampton (1603), and Baron Howland, of Streatham in the County of Surrey (1695) (and possibly the Barony of Bedford, which was merged into it in 1138, 1366 or 1414).  The courtesy title of the Duke of Bedford's eldest son and heir is Marquess of Tavistock.

Every Duke from the 5th Duke onwards is descended from Charles II of England. The family seat is Woburn Abbey, Bedfordshire. The private mausoleum and chapel of the Russell Family and the Dukes of Bedford is at St. Michael's Church in Chenies, Buckinghamshire (photo). The family owns The Bedford Estate in central London.

Dukes of Bedford, first Creation (1414)
Other titles: Earl of Kendal (1414) and Earl of Richmond (1414)
John of Lancaster, Duke of Bedford (1389–1435), third son of Henry IV

Dukes of Bedford, second Creation (1433)
Other titles: Earl of Kendal (1414) and Earl of Richmond (1414)
John of Lancaster, Duke of Bedford (1389–1435), regranted his dukedom with the standard remainder, died without issue

Dukes of Bedford, third Creation (1470)
Other titles: Marquess of Montagu (1470) and Baron Montagu (1461)
George Neville, Duke of Bedford (1457–1483), nephew of Warwick the Kingmaker, succeeded as Marquess of Montagu and Baron Montagu in 1471, deprived of all of his honours in 1478

Dukes of Bedford, fourth Creation (1478)
 George Plantagenet, Duke of Bedford (1477–1479), third son of Edward IV, died in infancy

Dukes of Bedford, fifth Creation (1485)
Other titles: Earl of Pembroke (1452)
Jasper Tudor, Duke of Bedford (1431–1495), uncle of Henry VII, regained his earldom a few months after his nephew's accession. He died without legitimate issue.

Earls of Bedford (1551)
Other titles: Baron Russell (1539)
John Russell, 1st Earl of Bedford (c. 1485–1555), a close advisor of Henry VIII, was later created Earl of Bedford, by then a close advisor of Henry's son Edward VI, was further honoured by him
Francis Russell, 2nd Earl of Bedford (1527–1585), son of the 1st Earl
Edward Russell, Lord Russell (1551–1572), eldest son of the 2nd Earl
John Russell, 3rd Baron Russell (c. 1553–1584), second son of the 2nd Earl, summoned to Parliament by writ of acceleration
Francis Russell, Lord Russell (c. 1554–1585), third son of the 2nd Earl
William Russell, 1st Baron Russell of Thornhaugh (c.1557–1613), fourth son of the 2nd Earl
Edward Russell, 3rd Earl of Bedford (1572–1627), son of Francis, Lord Russell
Other titles (4th Earl onwards): Baron Russell of Thornhaugh (1603)
Francis Russell, 4th Earl of Bedford (1593–1641), cousin of the 3rd Earl and son of Lord Russell of Thornhaugh (fourth son of the 2nd Earl)
William Russell, 5th Earl of Bedford (1616–1700), eldest son of the 4th Earl, was created Duke of Bedford in 1694
Francis Russell, Lord Russell (1638–1679), eldest son of the 5th Earl, died unmarried
Rt. Hon. William Russell, Lord Russell (1639–1683), second son of the 5th Earl, father of the 2nd Duke, was attainted and executed in 1683

Dukes of Bedford, sixth Creation (1694)

Other titles: Marquess of Tavistock (1694), Baron Howland (1695), Earl of Bedford (1551), Baron Russell (1538) and Baron Russell of Thornhaugh (1603)
William Russell, 1st Duke of Bedford (1616–1700), was created Duke of Bedford in 1694, after the Glorious Revolution
Francis Russell, Lord Russell (1638–1679), eldest son of the 1st Duke, died unmarried
Rt. Hon. William Russell, Lord Russell (1639–1683), second son of the 1st Duke
Wriothesley Russell, 2nd Duke of Bedford (1680–1711), only son of Rt. Hon. William Russell, Lord Russell (whose attainder had been reversed in 1688)
William Russell, Marquess of Tavistock (1703), eldest son of the 2nd Duke, died in infancy
William Russell, Marquess of Tavistock (1704–c. 1707), second son of the 2nd Duke, died young
Wriothesley Russell, 3rd Duke of Bedford (1708–1732), third son of the 2nd Duke, died without issue
John Russell, 4th Duke of Bedford (1710–1771), fourth and youngest son of the 2nd Duke
John Russell, Marquess of Tavistock (1732–1732), eldest son of the 4th Duke, died in infancy
Francis Russell, Marquess of Tavistock (1739–1767), second son of the 4th Duke and father of the 5th and 6th Dukes
Francis Russell, 5th Duke of Bedford (1765–1802), eldest son of Lord Tavistock, died without issue
John Russell, 6th Duke of Bedford (1766–1839), second son of Lord Tavistock
Francis Russell, 7th Duke of Bedford (1788–1861), eldest son of the 6th Duke
William Russell, 8th Duke of Bedford (1809–1872), only son of the 7th Duke, died unmarried
Francis Charles Hastings Russell, 9th Duke of Bedford (1819–1891), eldest son of Maj.-Gen. Lord George Russell, second son of the 6th Duke
George William Francis Sackville Russell, 10th Duke of Bedford (1852–1893), eldest son of the 9th Duke, died without issue
Herbrand Arthur Russell, 11th Duke of Bedford (1858–1940), second son of the 9th Duke
Hastings William Sackville Russell, 12th Duke of Bedford (1888–1953), only son of the 11th Duke
John Ian Robert Russell, 13th Duke of Bedford (1917–2002), eldest son of the 12th Duke
Henry Robin Ian Russell, 14th Duke of Bedford (1940–2003), eldest son of the 13th Duke
Andrew Ian Henry Russell, 15th Duke of Bedford (born 1962), eldest son of the 14th Duke

The heir apparent is the present holder's only son Henry Robin Charles Russell, Marquess of Tavistock (b. 2005).

Line of succession (simplified)

 John Russell, 6th Duke of Bedford (1766–1839)
Lord George William Russell (1790–1846)
 (Francis) Hastings Russell, 9th Duke of Bedford (1819–1891)
 Herbrand Russell, 11th Duke of Bedford (1858–1940)
 Hastings Russell, 12th Duke of Bedford (1888–1953)
 Ian Russell, 13th Duke of Bedford (1917–2002)
 Robin Russell, 14th Duke of Bedford (1940–2003)
 Andrew Russell, 15th Duke of Bedford (born 1962)
(1). Henry Robin Charles Russell, Marquess of Tavistock (born 2005)
(2). Lord Robin Loel Hastings Russell (born 1963)
(3). Lord James Edward Herbrand Russell (born 1975)
(4). Alexander Charles Robin Russell (born 2010)
(5). Leo William Caspar Russell (born 2013)
(6). Lord Rudolf Russell (born 1944)
(7). Lord Francis Hastings Russell (born 1950)
(8). John Francis Russell (born 1997)
(9). Harry Evelyn Terence Russell (born 1999)
Lord Hugh Hastings Russell (1923–2005)
male issue in line
Lord Arthur John Edward Russell (1825–1892)
Harold John Hastings Russell (1868–1926)
Anthony Arthur Russell (1904–1978)
male issue in line
Gilbert Byng Alwyne Russell (1875–1942)
Martin Basil Paul Russell (1918–2003)
male issue in line
 Odo Russell, 1st Baron Ampthill (1829–1884)Barons Ampthill John Russell, 1st Earl Russell (1792–1878)Earls RussellLord Charles James Fox Russell (1807–1894)
Henry Charles Russell (1842–1922)
Sir Thomas Wentworth Russell (1879–1954)
Sir John Wriothesley Russell (1914–1984)
male issue in line

Family Tree

See also
Baron Russell of Thornhaugh
Baron de Clifford
Earl Russell
Earls of Orford; First creation (1697)
Baron Ampthill

References

External links

 Heraldry of the Russell Family 

 
Dukedoms in the Peerage of England
Bedford Estate
Duke of Bedford
Noble titles created in 1414
Noble titles created in 1433
Noble titles created in 1470
Noble titles created in 1478
Noble titles created in 1485
Noble titles created in 1694